Cool Guys, Hot Ramen is a 2011 South Korean romantic comedy television series, starring Jung Il-woo, Lee Chung-ah, Lee Ki-woo, Park Min-woo, and Cho Yoon-woo. It aired on cable channel tvN from October 31 to December 20, 2011, on Wednesdays and Thursdays at 23:00 (KST) for 16 episodes.

The series is the first installment of tvN's "Oh! Boy" series of Flower Boy programming targeted at the teenage demographic, and was followed by Flower Band in 2012, Flower Boys Next Door in 2013 and Dating Agency: Cyrano in that same year.

Synopsis
Yang Eun-bi (Lee Chung-ah) is a university student in her mid-20s, preparing for her civil service exam with the dream of being a high school teacher. She accidentally encounters Cha Chi-soo (Jung Il-woo), the arrogant heir to the biggest food conglomerate in South Korea. Cha Chi-soo, newly homed after a failed attempt to attend school in New York City, fascinates women with his good looks and easy charm. Eun-bi was initially attracted to him, until she found out that he was only a high school senior, and thus 6 years younger than her. However, her student-teaching assignment finds her not only working at the high school that Chi-soo's family owns, but teaching his homeroom class. She grows to dislike him for his arrogance and lack of empathy. He, on the other hand, becomes fascinated with her because she is outspoken and athletic, unlike the other women he knows. Yet, he does not interpret the fascination as romantic interest, as he was out of her league and he usually only dates pretty, self-interested girls like Yoon So-yi - a ballet student now dating Chi-soo's rebellious classmate, Kim Ba-wool. Eun-bi resists her attraction in turn, believing Chi-soo is only toying with her. Eun-bi was looking for a more serious relationship, after being dumped by a cheating ex-boyfriend while waiting for him to complete his mandatory military service. She frequently turns to her dating-savvy roommate/ex-high school volleyball teammate Kang Dong-joo for advice.

After Eun-bi's father (Jung In-gi) passes away, she is surprised to find out that he left the ramen restaurant he owned to Choi Kang-hyuk (Lee Ki-woo), whom he had helped when Kang-hyuk was a troubled youth, instead of to her. It is soon revealed that Eun-bi's father did this in hope that Kang-hyuk and Eun-bi would marry. Eun-bi, after losing her student-teaching assignment because of her conflicts with Chi-soo, starts to work at the ramen shop, along with homeless fellow students Kim Ba-wool (Park Min-woo) and Woo Hyun-woo (Cho Yoon-woo). Chi-soo wants to work at the restaurant as well, in order to get over his growing obsession with Eun-bi. Kang-hyuk, who knows that he and Chi-soo actually have the same mother, allows him to join the shop out of concern for his cold half-brother.

Kang-hyuk quickly develops feelings for Eun-bi, but she finds herself more attracted to the passionate Chi-soo. Chi-soo, after many misunderstandings, realizes that his obsession with Eun-bi was actually attraction, and actively competes for Eun-bi's affections with Kang-hyuk. However, Chi-soo's father (Joo Hyun) disapproves. Chi-soo's (and Kang-hyuk's) mother had also been an average (not rich) woman, and Chi-soo's father believes that difference was one of the reasons for their separation several years ago. Chi-soo's father's company is planning to redevelop the area in which the ramen shop is located, and Chi-soo's father tries to use the possible destruction of the ramen shop as leverage to keep Eun-bi and Chi-soo apart. Chi-soo has become attached to the ramen shop and is also afraid of being disowned, and so he initially chooses to stay with his father. Eun-bi realizes, however, that she wants to try dating him seriously; she storms to his family's apartment to claim him from his father, and they leave together. The ramen shop is forced to close, but its workers accept this development without complaint. Chi-soo's father disinherits him and has his U.S. citizenship revoked, so that Chi-soo is now subject to the South Korean military draft. The show ends with Chi-soo visiting Eun-bi after he has completed his two-year service in the South Korean Army without contacting her; they kiss as the camera pans over the neighborhood where they first met.

Cast

Main
 Jung Il-woo as Cha Chi-soo
 Lee Chung-ah as Yang Eun-bi
 Lee Ki-woo as Choi Kang-hyuk
 Park Min-woo as Kim Ba-wool
 Cho Yoon-woo as Woo Hyun-woo

Supporting
 Kim Ye-won as Kang Dong-joo
 Ho Soo as Yoon So-yi
 Joo Hyun as Cha Ok-gyun
 Han Ji-wan as Joo Ya-soo
 Jung In-gi as Yang Chul-dong
 Seo Bum-suk as Director Ko
 Song Jae-rim as Hee-gon
 Kim Il-woong as Jung-gu
 Kim Hye-soo as fortuneteller (cameo, ep. 1)
 Gong Hyo-jin as record store clerk (cameo, ep. 9)

Production

The series was directed by Jung Jun-hwa, who previously helmed the 2008 film Lost and Found (also known as Sweet Lie). It was produced by Pyo Min-soo, along with the production crew of 2009 KBS drama Boys over Flowers.

Filming commenced on September 21, 2011, with Jung Il-woo playing Cha Chi-soo and his friends, at a cafe in Hongdae.

Reception
According to AGB Nielsen Media, the November 7 episode received a viewership rating of 2.07 percent, the highest rating in its timeslot, thus the most-watched cable program for the second week in a row. It also recorded a 200 percent increase in viewership from the previous episode among 20- to 49-year-old men. It was reported that it was the most-viewed show among women in their teens to 30s as well as among men in their teens to 20s. The series was watched by one in three teenage girls with 30 percent audience shares, and in Busan, it recorded five percent in viewership ratings. At its peak, the series scored viewership ratings in the four percent range, the highest ratings amongst its cable competitors in the same timeslot for eight weeks.

Its popularity has spawned a webcomic version of the show, taking off from characters Ba-wool and Hyun-woo as 20-year-olds managing a ramen restaurant. The cartoon has had over 1.8 million page views since its release on online portal Nate, with the number of visitors increasing by an average 32 percent per day.

Ratings
In this table,  represents the lowest ratings and  represents the highest ratings.

International broadcast
It premiered on Mnet Japan in January 2012, with reruns on terrestrial network TBS from June 12 to July 11, 2012.
 It was aired on Mnet's Channel M in March 2014.
 It premiered in the Philippines on TeleAsia Chinese on June 20, 2014. It also aired on TV5 from July 7 to August 22, 2014 under its alternate title Cool Guys, Hot Ramen. It is also being re-aired by TV5 every Sunday nights starting November 8, 2015.
 In Thailand, it was aired on Workpoint TV on October 22, 2013.

References

External links
  
 
 

2011 South Korean television series debuts
2011 South Korean television series endings
Korean-language television shows
TVN (South Korean TV channel) television dramas
South Korean romantic comedy television series
South Korean cooking television series
Television series set in restaurants
Television series by Oh! Boy Project